Alpha Ventus Offshore Wind Park (before renaming known as Borkum West Offshore Wind Park) is Germany's first offshore wind farm.

History

The application for construction of the wind farm near Borkum was submitted in 1999. The permit was given by the Federal Maritime and Hydrographic Agency in 2001. In 2007, contracts for supplying wind turbines were signed with REpower and Multibrid (later: Areva Wind and Adwen). That same year, a contract for the construction of a subsea cable connection to the German grid was signed. Construction of the alpha ventus substation started in July 2008. On 15 July 2009 the first wind turbine was installed and the first six turbines delivered by Multibrid went operational in August 2009. Installation of another six turbines delivered by REpower started in September 2009. The foundations for the Multibrid turbines were so called tripods designed by OWT. The foundations for the REpower turbines were developed and designed by OWEC Tower. Construction of the wind farm was completed on 16 November 2009 after a seven-month construction period. On 27 April 2010 the farm was officially opened and set into commercial operation.

Description
The wind farm is owned by Deutsche Offshore-Testfeld und Infrastruktur-GmbH & Co. KG, a joint venture of EWE (47.5%), E.ON (26.25%), and Vattenfall (26.25%).  It consists of twelve turbines, all with capacity of five megawatts. There are six Adwen AD 5-116 (former Areva Multibrid (M5000)) turbines and six REpower 5M turbines.  Turbines stand in 30 m of water and are not visible from land, however they are barely visible from Norderney's lighthouse, and easily from the island of Borkum. The REpower turbines are installed onto jacket foundations (OWEC Jacket Quattropods) by the crane ship Thialf and Adwen turbines are installed onto tripod-style foundations by the jack-up barge Odin. In May 2010, two Multibrid generators went off service due severe overheating in their gearboxes.

Due to delays, the cost of the project grew from 190 million to 250 million euro (US$270 to $357 million), or 4200 €/kW (6000 $/kW).

In 2011, the wind farm had the highest registered capacity factor of 50.8% of most European offshore wind farms. This was exceeded in 2012 with a capacity factor of 55%, a global record. The project team noted that the expected capacity factor of 42% was a considerable underestimation. However, in 2013 the capacity factor was 42.7%. This is likely due to other wind parks nearby being built, since wind turbines slow down the wind slightly.

Research
Because it is the first offshore wind farm in Germany, alpha ventus is accompanied by several research projects sponsored by the Federal Ministry for Environment (BMU). In 2003, the research platform FINO 1 was built approximately 400 m to the west of the wind farm. Research interests include: 
investigation of the flow conditions in the wind farm
measurement of wind and wave load
further development and adaptation of wind turbine components to offshore conditions
accompanying ecological research
development of new wind farm control systems
logistic problems and the grid integration of offshore wind farms
Power curve test methodology
Investigation of wind turbine wakes
Assessment of the wind turbine induction zone

See also

Wind power in Germany

References

External links
 
 alpha ventus website
 Alpha Ventus Datasheet, LORC
 Alpha Ventus Datasheet, 4c
 Video of helicopter operations 

Wind farms in Germany
Offshore wind farms in the North Sea
E.ON
Vattenfall wind farms
Borkum
2009 establishments in Germany
Energy infrastructure completed in 2009